Raymordella is a subgenus of beetles in the family Mordellidae, containing the following species:

Raymordella xanthosoma Franciscolo, 1967

References

Mordellidae
Monotypic insect taxa
Insect subgenera